Michael Chen may refer to:
 Michael Chen (gangster), Chinese-born American gangster
 Michael Chen (politician), Malaysian politician
 Chen He, also known as Michael Chen, Chinese actor
See also:
Mike Chen, American YouTuber